The Richmond–Petersburg Turnpike was a toll road located in the Richmond-Petersburg region of central Virginia, United States.

After World War II, major traffic congestion occurred in the area around Richmond and Petersburg along U.S. Route 1 (US 1) and US 301. This was particularly true where these two major routes shared the same roadway for much of the distance between the two cities, as well as bridges across the James River and Appomattox River.

To help alleviate the problems, in 1955 the Virginia General Assembly created a political subdivision, the Richmond Petersburg Turnpike Authority. The authority was administered by a board of directors. Its members were appointed by the local governing bodies of the jurisdictions through which the turnpike passed, one member from each locality. It was given the mission to sell toll revenue bonds to build and operate a new toll highway parallel to the existing US 1 and US 301 between Henrico County just north of Richmond and Dinwiddie County just south of Petersburg, with new bridges over the two major rivers. Opened in 1958, and funded through toll revenue bonds, it was conceived prior to the creation of the Interstate Highway System.

Tolls were removed completely in 1992. Today, the former Richmond–Petersburg Turnpike forms  of Interstate 95 (I-95) in central Virginia as well as the northernmost  of I-85 in Petersburg and Dinwiddie County. The  of I-64 which overlap I-95 in Richmond were also part of the turnpike.

History

In 1826, a privately operated toll road known as the Manchester and Petersburg Turnpike opened that extended through Chesterfield County between Richmond and Petersburg. At some point it became known as the Richmond and Petersburg Turnpike. In 1922 much of that route was renamed Jefferson Davis Highway and in 1926 was also designated U.S. Routes 1 and 301. Some Chesterfield County and Colonial Heights land deeds still reference the name Richmond–Petersburg Turnpike for properties along Jefferson Davis Highway. Historical accounts of 1864 Civil War events mention that name as well.

Richmond-Petersburg Turnpike Authority

After World War II, the busy north–south corridor in central Virginia shared by US 1 and US 301 and the Jefferson Davis Memorial Highway through the cities of Richmond, Colonial Heights and Petersburg and along the Jefferson Davis Highway between the cities was heavily developed commercially. With only four traffic lanes and long stretches of undivided roadway, it became a major area of traffic congestion, as well as the site of occasional spectacular and deadly head-on collisions.

In 1955, prior to the creation of the U.S. Interstate Highway System, the Virginia General Assembly created the Richmond–Petersburg Turnpike Authority as an independent state agency to administer (design, finance, acquire right-of-way, construct, operate, collect tolls, and maintain) the new Turnpike of the same name. The new toll road was planned with only 15 exits, and most of these were well away from the highly developed commercial areas along parallel US 1 and US 301.

Funded with proceeds from toll revenue bonds sold by the Authority, the -long road cost $76.7 million to build, including new bridges over the James River in Richmond and the Appomattox River between Colonial Heights and Petersburg. It featured six lanes from the northern entrance to just south of the new James River Bridge in Richmond, and four lanes from that point south. At Petersburg, the new Turnpike split into two branches, one leading to US 301 south towards Emporia and Weldon, North Carolina, and the other to US 1 south, which led to South Hill and Raleigh, North Carolina.

The new expressway opened on July 1, 1958, and in August, the State Highway Commission designated it as part of Interstate 95. A piece near Petersburg was designated Interstate 85, and the turnpike became a grandfathered part of the Interstate Highway System even though no federal aid was used to build it. The new roadway achieved the intended diversion of long distance traffic. As earlier feared, hotels, motels, tourist homes and cabins, and restaurants along the bypassed highways suffered tremendous loss of business, and many failed. However, due to the relatively high rate of tolls on the Turnpike, the blow was softened by a continually increasing traffic flow and patronage of motorists wanting to avoid the tolls, who continued to use the old roads. This practice of avoiding roads and bridges with tolls is known as "shunpiking".

Jackson Ward
The construction of the Richmond–Petersburg Turnpike in the 1950s led to the destruction of many blocks of homes and businesses in Jackson Ward, Richmond's oldest historically African-American community. The highway bisected the neighborhood and has had irreparable effects on its fabric. As was common in mid-century planning practices, lower class or black neighborhoods were often targeted and destroyed, such as the Hayti community of Durham North Carolina.  This highway, along with the construction of Richmond's Downtown Expressway, were large factors in the decline and subsequent decay in many urban areas of the city.

Expansion

The original toll revenue bonds were retired in 1975. However, in 1973, the General Assembly passed legislation which transferred the Authority's duties to the Virginia Department of Highways, the predecessor agency to the Virginia Department of Transportation (VDOT). The Authority as an independent entity ceased to exist and the Board of Directors disbanded. In December 1973, additional bonds were issued to provide much-needed improvements to the heavily traveled highway. Unlike the original toll revenue bonds which were backed only by toll revenue, the new bonds were backed by the Commonwealth of Virginia. They were still funded by toll revenue but the bondholders had more security with state backing and thus offered lower interest rates. A primary factor in turning the turnpike over to the Virginia Department of Highways was to obtain full state control since the state was taking the risk on the bonds.

Several other major interchanges including Chester/Hopewell and Broad Street at downtown Richmond were also reconstructed.

Once the bonds were paid off, toll revenue funded safety improvements on the entire turnpike which included sign and guardrail replacements as well as replacing most of the median guardrail with Jersey style concrete median barriers. Toll money was also spent on nearby road projects such as the Temple Avenue extension (State Route 144). Since interstate travelers were paying most of the tolls that was then being spent on other projects, toll removal became a local political issue that the General Assembly eventually decided to approximately coincide with the opening of the parallel Interstate 295.

Tolls removed, modernization

Tolls were removed from all portions of the former Richmond–Petersburg Turnpike in 1992, although the road now connects with several newer locally oriented toll facilities, including Richmond Metropolitan Authority's Downtown Expressway (State Route 195) which interchanges with the former Turnpike on the I-95 James River Bridge, and the Pocahontas Parkway (State Route 895) which connects I-95 at exit 67 with Interstate 295 and the Richmond International Airport.

The original office building with the iconic "Richmond Petersburg Turnpike" lettering was located at exit 61A on southbound Interstate 95 and was used by VDOT until it was demolished in 2021 during improvements to the interchange.

Today, the former Richmond–Petersburg Turnpike with the I-95 designation, and parallel Interstate 295 (which forms an eastern bypass of Richmond and Petersburg) carry some of the heaviest traffic flows of any portion of the busy eastern U.S. corridor between Florida and New England.

Exit list

References

External links

Roads to the Future - Richmond-Petersburg Turnpike (I-95/I-85) and I-295
Roads to the Future - Richmond Interstates and Expressways - Richmond-Petersburg Turnpike

Former toll roads in Virginia
Transportation in Petersburg, Virginia
Tolled sections of Interstate Highways
Interstate 95
Interstate 85
Transportation in Richmond, Virginia
1955 establishments in Virginia
1992 disestablishments in Virginia
Interstate 64